The 2018 Rugby Europe Women's Conference is the third division of the 2018 season of the Rugby Europe Women's Sevens. The tournament will be held in Zagreb, Croatia on 8–9 June, with the two highest-placing teams promoted to the 2019 Trophy.

Pool stage

Pool A

Pool B

Pool C

Knockout stage

Challenge Trophy

5th Place

Cup

Final standings

References

External links
 Tournament page

Conferences
2018
2018 rugby sevens competitions
Rug
rugby sevens